The 2016 Redditch Borough Council election took place on 5 May 2016 to elect members of Redditch Borough Council in England. This was on the same day as other local elections.

Results

Ward Results

Batchley & Brockhill

Central

Church Hill

Greenlands

Headless Cross & Oakenshaw

Lodge Park

Matchborough

West

Winyates

References

2016 English local elections
2016
2010s in Worcestershire